Frans Herman Koskinen (8 March 1869 - 26 April 1918; original surname Tähti) was a Finnish journalist and politician, born in Maaria. He was a member of the Parliament of Finland from 1907 to 1911, representing the Social Democratic Party of Finland (SDP). In 1918 he was imprisoned for having sided with the Reds during the Finnish Civil War. He died in detention at Hollola.

References

1869 births
1918 deaths
Politicians from Turku
People from Turku and Pori Province (Grand Duchy of Finland)
Social Democratic Party of Finland politicians
Members of the Parliament of Finland (1907–08)
Members of the Parliament of Finland (1908–09)
Members of the Parliament of Finland (1909–10)
Members of the Parliament of Finland (1910–11)
People of the Finnish Civil War (Red side)
Prisoners who died in Finnish detention